Travelogue may refer to:

Genres
 Travel literature, a record of the experiences of an author travelling
 Travel documentary, a documentary film or television program that describes travel in general

Titles
 Travelogue (Joni Mitchell album), a 2002 jazz album
 Travelogue (Kashmir album), a 1994 rock album
 Travelogue (The Human League album), a 1980 electronic album
 Travelogue (TV program), a 2003 Chinese adventure tourism television program
 Travelogue: Blues Traveler Classics, 2002 blues rock album